Cow urine or Gomutra is a liquid by-product of metabolism in cows. Cow urine is used as medicine in some places of India, Myanmar, and Nigeria. While cow urine and cow dung have benefits as fertilizers, the proponents' claims about its curing diseases and cancer have no scientific backing.

Usage

Medicinal use

Some Hindus claim that cow urine has a special significance as a medicinal drink. The sprinkling of cow urine is said to have a spiritual cleansing effect as well.

Cow urine is used for attempted therapeutic purposes in ancient Ayurvedic medicine. Urine of a pregnant cow is considered special; it is claimed to contain special hormones and minerals. 
According to ayurvedas, Gomutra (cow urine) can cure leprosy, fevers, peptic ulcers, liver ailments, kidney disorders, asthma, certain allergies, psoriasis, anaemia and even cancer. One of India's largest Ayurvedic companies, Patanjali Ayurved, sells urine-based products.

Cow urine is also used in Myanmar and Nigeria as a folk medicine. In Nigeria, a concoction of leaves of tobacco, garlic and lemon basil juice, rock salt and cow urine is used in an attempt to treat convulsions in children. This has resulted in the death of several children from respiratory depression.

As a floor cleaner
A floor-cleaning fluid called Gaunyle is marketed by an organisation called Holy Cow Foundation. Maneka Gandhi, Women and Child Development Minister, has proposed that Gaunyle be used instead of Phenyl in government offices. In May 2015, Rajendra Singh Rathore, Medical and Health Minister of Rajasthan, inaugurated a  cow-urine refinery in Jalore. The refinery was set up by Parthvimeda Gau Pharma Pvt. Ltd. which produces a floor cleaner called Gocleaner.

In organic farming

Gomutra is used as a manure for production of rice. Jeevamrutha is a fertilizer made from a mixture of cow urine, cow dung, jaggery, pulse flour and rhizosphere soil.

Diesel-cow urine emulsion 
Cow urine has also been used in various researches for the preparation of emulsified diesel. The results found with such a newly synthesized emulsion were quite satisfactory for diesel exhaust emissions and engine efficiency.

See also 
 Camel urine
 Alternative cancer treatments
 Alternative medicine
 Aqua omnium florum
 Cattle in religion and mythology

References

External links 
 

Ayurvedic medicaments
Biopesticides
Organic fertilizers
Urine